James Pitaro is an American media executive and attorney. On March 5, 2018, The Walt Disney Company announced he would become president of ESPN Inc. Pitaro graduated in 1987 from Edgemont High School in Scarsdale, New York. In 1991, Pitaro  graduated from Cornell's College of Human Ecology with a Bachelor of Science degree in Consumer Economics And Housing. He was a player on the Cornell Big Red football team. He earned his Juris Doctor from St. John's University Law School in 1994. He previously worked for Yahoo's Media division, Wilson Elser Moskowitz Edelman & Dicker and Disney Interactive. Since 1997, he has been married to actress Jean Louisa Kelly. On October 12, 2020, his position changed to Chairman, ESPN and Sports Content.

References

 

Living people
Cornell Big Red football players
Presidents of ESPN
St. John's University School of Law alumni
American business executives
Cornell University College of Human Ecology alumni
Year of birth missing (living people)
Edgemont Junior – Senior High School alumni